This page records the details of the matches played by the Japan national football team during 2008. In 2008 the Japan national football team competed in the third and fourth round of the AFC 2010 FIFA World Cup qualifications, the 2008 East Asian Cup Final, and the 2008 Kirin Cup, amongst other friendly matches.

Schedule

Players statistics

Top goal scorers for 2008

Kits

Coach
Takeshi Okada was the coach for the whole year.

References

External links
Japan Football Association

Japan national football team results
2008 in Japanese football
Japan